St. Francis Hospital and Heart Center (known casually as St. Francis Hospital or simply as St. Francis) is a 449-bed non-profitteaching hospital located in Flower Hill, on Long Island, in New York, United States. It is New York State's only specialty-designated cardiac center.

The hospital is affiliated with the New York Institute of Technology for clerkship education at the New York Institute of Technology College of Osteopathic Medicine. 

St. Francis is nationally ranked by U.S. News & World Report in Cardiology and Heart Surgery, Gastroenterology, Geriatrics, Neurology, Neurosurgery, and Orthopedics. St. Francis is also ranked #6 in New York State as well as #6 in the New York Metropolitan Area.

History 
The origins of St. Francis Hospital & Heart Center can be traced back to 1922, when Carlos W. Munson, a wealthy Flower Hill resident and the heir to the Munson Steamship Company – along with his wife, Mabel, gave a 15-acre parcel of their property to the Franciscan Missionaries of Mary. The Franciscan Missionaries opened a convent on the land and used it as a camp for poor and chronically-ill children from New York City.

On May 8, 1935, Gloria Vanderbilt received her first communion at the convent located at St. Francis.

In 1937, 2% of Brooklyn schoolchildren suffered from rheumatic heart conditions and needed charitable healthcare assistance. As a result, the camp was transformed into a cardiac sanatorium for children. By 1941, St. Francis featured 125 beds, caring for children between 6 and 16 years of age with an average stay of 8 months. The hospital expanded in 1954 to care for adult patients and had grown to house 227 beds and 5 operating rooms by 1973.

In December 1983, First Lady Nancy Reagan visited St. Francis Hospital after she and President Ronald Reagan brought two children, Ah Ji Sook (7) and Lee Kil Woo (4), from South Korea to the United States in November 1983 for open-heart surgery at St. Francis Hospital. Mrs. Reagan held a press conference at St. Francis Hospital that December 15th; the surgery saved the lives of both children.

In 1988, an acute care wing at St. Francis Hospital was dedicated to Nancy Reagan for saving the lives of the two children in 1983. Reagan attended the Nancy Reagan Hall's dedication ceremony and opening in October 4, 1988.

After Avianca Flight 52 crashed on January 25, 1990 in Cove Neck, St. Francis Hospital was one of several area hospitals that took in and cared for passengers injured in the crash.

In 2012, St. Francis Hospital renovated their emergency room, expanding it and making it more energy-efficient.

Notable patient 

 Alfred A. Lama – Italian-American architect and politician known for his sponsoring of New York state's Mitchell–Lama Housing Program; died at St. Francis Hospital in 1984.

Transportation 
St. Francis Hospital is served by the n23 bus route, which is operated by Nassau Inter-County Express (NICE). The n23 stops directly in front of the hospital's main entrance, on Port Washington Boulevard (NY 101).

See also 

 North Shore University Hospital – Another nearby hospital, located in Manhasset.
 Saint Catherine of Siena Medical Center – Another Catholic Health Services of Long Island hospital, located in Smithtown.

References

External links 

St. Francis Hospital

Flower Hill, New York
Hospital buildings completed in 1922
Hospitals in New York (state)
History of New York (state)
Hospitals established in 1922
Buildings and structures in Nassau County, New York

Teaching hospitals in New York (state)
New York Institute of Technology